Walton Street is a street within central London's Chelsea district, bordering Knightsbridge. It runs south-west to north-east from Draycott Avenue to Walton Place, parallel to Brompton Road to the north.

It is known for its boutiques and restaurants.

On 18 November 1975, the Walton's Restaurant bombing took place, when an Irish Republican Army (IRA) unit nicknamed the Balcombe Street Gang threw a bomb into Walton's Restaurant without warning, killing two people and injuring almost two dozen.

Notable residents
Jahangir Hajiyev and Zamira Hajiyeva, Azerbaijani banker and fraudster, and his wife
Edwin La Dell (1914–1970), artist
Berthold Wolpe (1905–1989), printer, at No. 102

References

External links 

Walton Street, London
Knightsbridge
Streets in the Royal Borough of Kensington and Chelsea